The 2022–23 Prairie View A&M Panthers basketball team represented Prairie View A&M University in the 2022–23 NCAA Division I men's basketball season. The Panthers, led by seventh-year head coach Byron Smith, played their home games at the William Nicks Building in Prairie View, Texas as members of the Southwestern Athletic Conference.

Previous season
The Panthers finished the 2021–22 season 8–19, 8–10 in SWAC play to finish in a tie for eighth place. In the SWAC tournament, they lost in the first round to Alcorn State.

Roster

Schedule and results

|-
!colspan=12 style=| Non-conference regular season

|-
!colspan=12 style=| SWAC regular season

|-
!colspan=9 style=| SWAC tournament

Sources

References

Prairie View A&M Panthers basketball seasons
Prairie View AandM Panthers
Prairie View AandM Panthers basketball
Prairie View AandM Panthers basketball